Dolega   is a corregimiento in Dolega District, Chiriquí Province, Panama. It is the seat of Dolega District. Its population as of 1990 was 5,256; its population as of 2000 was 7,516.

References

Corregimientos of Chiriquí Province